Eury De La Rosa (born February 24, 1990) is a Dominican former professional baseball pitcher. He had played in Major League Baseball (MLB) for the Arizona Diamondbacks.

Career

Arizona Diamondbacks
De La Rosa was signed as an amateur free agent by the Arizona Diamondbacks on June 27, 2008. He began his professional career that year with the Diamondbacks' Dominican Summer League team and then moved to the Pioneer League the next year with the Missoula Osprey.

In 2010 with the Yakima Bears of the Northwest League he had a 1.00 earned run average (ERA) in 27 games and was selected to the post-season all-star team. The following year he had  a 1.36 ERA in 39 games for the South Bend Silver Hawks of the Class-A Midwest League. In 2012, he was in 53 games for the Southern League champion Mobile BayBears, with a 2.84 ERA.

De La Rosa began 2013 with the AAA Reno Aces of the Pacific Coast League and was then promoted to the Majors with the Diamondbacks where he made his debut with two perfect innings of relief against the Milwaukee Brewers on July 14. He pitched in a total of 44 games for the Diamondbacks between 2013 and 2014 with 51.1 innings and 24 earned runs for a  4.21 ERA.

Oakland Athletics
The Diamondbacks traded him to the Oakland Athletics for cash considerations on December 18, 2014, and the Athletics designated him for assignment on April 25. He appeared in seven games for the Nashville Sounds and did not allow a run in his six innings of relief.

Los Angeles Dodgers
On April 30, he was claimed off waivers by the Los Angeles Dodgers and assigned to the AAA Oklahoma City Dodgers. He was designated for assignment on May 19.

San Diego Padres
On May 23, he was claimed off waivers by the San Diego Padres. He was designated for assignment on June 19. He cleared waivers and was outrighted to the AAA El Paso Chihuahuas.

Long Island Ducks
On April 18, 2016, De La Rosa signed with the Long Island Ducks of the Atlantic League of Professional Baseball.

Houston Astros
On August 14, 2016, De La Rosa signed a minor league deal with the Houston Astros. On November 7, 2016, De La Rosa elected free agency.

Second stint with Long Island Ducks
De La Rosa resigned with them for the 2017 season. He became a free agent after the 2017 season.

After the 2020 season, he played for Panama in the 2021 Caribbean Series.

References

External links

1990 births
Arizona Diamondbacks players
Dominican Republic expatriate baseball players in the United States
Dominican Summer League Diamondbacks players
El Paso Chihuahuas players
Estrellas Orientales players

Living people
Long Island Ducks players
Major League Baseball pitchers
Major League Baseball players from the Dominican Republic
Missoula Osprey players
Mobile BayBears players
Nashville Sounds players
Oklahoma City Dodgers players
People from Santiago de los Caballeros
Reno Aces players
San Antonio Missions players
South Bend Silver Hawks players
Visalia Rawhide players
Yakima Bears players
Dominican Republic expatriate baseball players in Panama